The Sky Burns is a 1958 Italian war drama film written and directed by Giuseppe Masini and starring Amedeo Nazzari and Antonella Lualdi.

Plot

Cast 

Amedeo Nazzari as Carlo Casati
Antonella Lualdi as  Laura
Folco Lulli as  Tazzoli
Fausto Tozzi as  Marchi
Franco Interlenghi as  Ferri
Faith Domergue as Anna 
Walter Santesso as  Damonte
Lída Baarová  as  Little girl's mother 
Santiago Rivero 	as The Doctor
Harald Maresch 	as Spanò 
Luigi Tosi as  Maselli
Enzo Fiermonte 
 Evar Maran  
Emma Baron 
Nino Marchetti

References

External links

1958 films
Italian war drama films
1950s war drama films
1958 drama films
Italian World War II films
1950s Italian films